The 10th Legislative Assembly of Quebec was the provincial legislature in Quebec, Canada that existed from December 7, 1900, to November 25, 1904. The Quebec Liberal Party led by Simon-Napoléon Parent was the governing party.

Seats per political party

 After the 1900 elections

Member list

This was the list of members of the Legislative Assembly of Quebec that were elected in the 1900 election:

Other elected MLAs

Other MLAs were elected during this term in by-elections

 Jean-Cléophas Blouin, Quebec Liberal Party, Lévis, October 24, 1901 
 Joseph Laferté, Quebec Liberal Party, Drummond, October 31, 1901 
 Cyrille Fraser Delage, Quebec Liberal Party, Québec, October 31, 1901 
 Hormidas Pilon, Quebec Liberal Party, Vaudreuil, October 31, 1901 
 Arthur Godbout, Quebec Liberal Party, Beauce, January 31, 1902 
 Joseph-Édouard Caron, Quebec Liberal Party, L'Islet, September 26, 1902 
 Arcand-Momer Bissonnette, Quebec Conservative Party, Soulanges, October 3, 1902 
 James Sarsfield McCorkill, Quebec Liberal Party, Brome, October 29, 1903 
 Joseph Lafontaine, Quebec Liberal Party, Berthier, March 10, 1904 
 Georges Lafontaine, Quebec Conservative Party, Maskinongé, March 10, 1904 
 Damase-Épiphane Naud, Quebec Conservative Party, Portneuf, March 10, 1904 
 Auguste Mathieu, Quebec Liberal Party, Shefford, March 10, 1904

Cabinet Ministers

 Prime Minister and Executive Council President: Simon-Napoleon Parent
 Agriculture: François-Gilbert Miville Dechêne (1900-1902), Adelard Turgeon (1902-1904)
 Colonization and Mines: Adélard Turgeon (1900-1901)
 Public Works: Lomer Gouin (1900-1901)
 Colonization and Public Works: Lomer Gouin (1901-1904)
 Lands, Forests and Fishing: Simon-Napoléon Parent (1900-1901)
 Lands, Mines and Fishing: Simon-Napoleon Parent (1901-1904)
 Attorney General:Horace Archambault
 Provincial secretary: Adélard Turgeon (1901-1902), Amédée Robitaille (1902-1904)
 Treasurer: Henry Thomas Duffy (1900-1903), Simon-Napoleon Parent (1903), John Charles McCorkill (1903-1904)
 Members without portfolios, George Washington Stephens, James John Guerin, William Alexander Weir (1903-1904)

References
 1900 election results
 List of historical Cabinet Ministers

10